The Werner Knoop House is a historic house at 6 Ozark Point in Little Rock, Arkansas.  Built in 1936–37, it is a rare example of Art Moderne residential architecture in the city.  It is a two-story L-shaped structure, its exterior finished in brick with flush mortar joints and painted white, with asymmetrically arranged steel-frame windows in a variety of sizes and shapes. Its entrance is recessed in a rectangular opening framed by stone, immediately to the right of the projecting two-car garage.  The house was built for Werner Knoop, owner of a local construction company, to a design by the local firm Brueggeman, Swaim & Allen.

The house was listed on the National Register of Historic Places in 1990.

See also
National Register of Historic Places listings in Little Rock, Arkansas

References

Houses on the National Register of Historic Places in Arkansas
Streamline Moderne architecture in the United States
Houses in Little Rock, Arkansas
National Register of Historic Places in Little Rock, Arkansas
Historic district contributing properties in Arkansas